Tephritis afrostriata is a species of tephritid or fruit flies in the genus Tephritis of the family Tephritidae.

Distribution

References

Tephritinae
Insects described in 2013